The men's track time trial cycling event at the 1984 Summer Olympics took place on 30 July and was one of eight cycling events at the 1984 Olympics. There were 25 competitors from 25 nations, with each nation limited to one cyclist. Two other cyclists entered but did not start. The event was won by Fredy Schmidtke of West Germany, the nation's first victory in the men's track time trial and the third consecutive Games in which a German cyclist won (with East Germany victorious in 1976 and 1980). Curt Harnett earned Canada's first medal in the event with his silver, while France returned to the podium for the first time since 1968 with Fabrice Colas's bronze.

Background

This was the 14th appearance of the event, which had previously been held in 1896 and every Games since 1928. It would be held every Games until being dropped from the programme after 2004. The returning cyclists from 1980 were bronze medalist David Weller of Jamaica and sixth-place finisher Heinz Isler of Switzerland. The Soviet-led boycott kept out defending Olympic champion Lothar Thoms of East Germany and reigning world champion Sergey Kopylov of the Soviet Union. The favorite among those competing was 1982 world champion Fredy Schmidtke.

The Cayman Islands and Chinese Taipei each made their debut in the men's track time trial. France and Great Britain each made their 14th appearance, having competed at every appearance of the event.

Competition format

The event was a time trial on the track, with each cyclist competing separately to attempt to achieve the fastest time. Each cyclist raced one kilometre from a standing start.

Records

The following were the world and Olympic records prior to the competition.

No new world or Olympic records were set during the competition.

Schedule

All times are Pacific Daylight Time (UTC-7)

Results

References

Cycling at the 1984 Summer Olympics
Cycling at the Summer Olympics – Men's track time trial
Track cycling at the 1984 Summer Olympics